Stars on Parade may refer to:

 Stars on Parade (1936 film), a British musical film directed by Oswald Mitchell
 Stars on Parade (1944 film), an American musical film directed by Lew Landers
 Stars on Parade (TV series), an American TV series (1953–54)
 "Stars on Parade", a song by Daniel Johnston on his album Don't Be Scared
 Stars on Parade (Disneyland Paris Parade)